Roy Stolk (born 11 January 1981 in Leiden) is a Dutch former professional snooker player. Between 2006 and 2007, he was on the Main Tour by winning the Romanian Open. At the end of the season, he slipped off.

Performance and rankings timeline

Amateur finals: 24 (15 titles)

References

External links
 Profile at globalsnooker.co.uk
 

1979 births
Living people
Dutch snooker players
Sportspeople from Leiden